{{Infobox motor race
| Race title             = Fr8 Auctions 208
| Logo                   =
| Track map              = 
| Series long            = NASCAR Camping World Truck Series
| Venue                  = Atlanta Motor Speedway
| Location               = Hampton, Georgia, United States
| Sponsor                = Fr8Auctions
| First race             = 2004
| Last race              = 2022
| Distance               = 
| Laps                   = 135Stage 1/2 30 Laps Stage 3 75 Laps
| Previous names         =Easy Care Vehicle Service Contracts 200 (2004)World Financial Group 200 (2005)John Deere 200 (2006)American Commercial Lines 200 (2007–2009)E-Z-GO 200 (2010)Good Sam Club 200 (2011)Jeff Foxworthy's Grit Chips 200 (2012)Hyundai Construction Equipment 200 (2015)Great Clips 200 (2016) Active Pest Control 200 (2017–2018)Ultimate Tailgating 200 (2019)Vet Tix/Camping World 200 (2020)Fr8 Auctions 200 (2021)
| Most wins driver       = Kyle Busch (4)
| Most wins team         = Kyle Busch Motorsports (4)
| Most wins manufacturer = Toyota (10)
| Surface                = Asphalt
| Length mi              = 1.54
| Turns                  = 4
}}
The Fr8Auctions 208 is a NASCAR Camping World Truck Series race held at Atlanta Motor Speedway. It was initially held from 2004 until 2012 and taken off the schedule in 2013. The race returned to the schedule in 2015 and since then has been held on the Saturday of the race weekend as a doubleheader with the track's NASCAR Xfinity Series race, the Nalley Cars 250, prior to the NASCAR Cup Series' Folds of Honor QuikTrip 500 race at the track on Sunday.

History

In 2016, Great Clips became the title sponsor of the race.

In 2020, series title sponsor Camping World sponsored the race along with the Veteran Tickets Foundation (Vet Tix), which is an organization that gives out tickets to sporting events to members of the U.S. Armed Forces.

Fr8 (pronounced "freight") Auctions became the title sponsor of the race in 2021. Stages 1 and 2 were both 30 laps long and the final stage was 70 laps long. They returned as the title sponsor in 2022 when the race was lengthened by 8 miles. Therefore, the name of the race became the Fr8 Auctions 208.

Past winners

Notes2004–2006, 2018, 2020 and 2023: Race extended due to NASCAR overtime.
 2020:''' Race postponed from March 14 to June 6 due to the COVID-19 pandemic.

Multiple winners (drivers)

Multiple winners (teams)

Manufacturer wins

References

External links
 

NASCAR Truck Series races
 
Annual sporting events in the United States
2004 establishments in Georgia (U.S. state)
2015 establishments in Georgia (U.S. state)
Recurring sporting events established in 2004
Recurring sporting events established in 2015